Republic is an unincorporated community in Kanawha County, West Virginia, United States, along Cabin Creek. It was also known as Jochin. Its post office  is closed.

References 

Unincorporated communities in West Virginia
Unincorporated communities in Kanawha County, West Virginia